Aqua and Aria is a utopian science fantasy manga written and illustrated by Kozue Amano. The series is set in the 24th century on a terraformed Mars, and follows a young woman named Akari as she trains as an apprentice gondolier. Aqua was originally published by Enix in its Monthly Stencil magazine from 2001 to 2002 and collected in two tankōbon volumes. When the series moved to Mag Garden's Comic Blade magazine in November 2002, the title changed to Aria. Mag Garden later re-released the two volumes of Aqua with additional material and new covers. Serialization completed in April 2008. In all, the 70 serialized chapters of Aqua and Aria were collected in 14 tankōbon volumes released between 3 October 2003 to 10 March 2008 in the Mag Garden editions. Each volume, called a "voyage", contains five chapters called "navigations", covering a season of the Aqua year.

The series has been adapted by Hal Film Maker as a 54-episode anime television series, with a first season broadcast in 2005 on TV Tokyo Network, a second season in 2006, an OVA released September 2007, and a third season in 2008 that ended around the same time as the manga serialization. A new OVA, called Aria the Avvenire, was released in the 10th anniversary Blu-Ray Box sets of the anime series between 24 December 2015 and 24 June 2016.

In English, Aria (but not Aqua) was originally licensed by ADV Manga, who dropped the license after publishing three volumes. The North American license for Aqua and Aria was picked up by Tokyopop, which began releasing the series, starting with the first volume of Aqua on 9 October 2007. The series has been licensed in France by Kami, in Germany by Tokyopop Germany, in Italy by Star Comics, in Indonesia by M&C Comics, in South Korea by Bookbox, in Spain by Editorial Ivrea, in Taiwan by Tong Li Comics, and in Thailand by Bongkoch Comics.

In 2017, Tokyopop released a collector's edition of the Aqua and Aria chapters as Aria: The Masterpiece in seven volumes. They also plan to reprint the series in 2021 given enough advance orders.

Chapters and volumes

Aqua

Aria

See also 
 List of Aria episodes
 List of Aria soundtracks

References

External links 
 Aqua manga Tokyopop website
 Aria manga Tokyopop website
 

Aria